The Under-the-Rim Trail is a  hiking trail in Bryce Canyon National Park, Utah. The trail was established by the National Park Service to provide access to the portions of the park located below the rim of the Paunsaugunt Plateau, whose edge forms the eroded natural amphitheater for which the park is famous. Plans dating to 1932 proposed the trail so that wooded portions of the park's east side could be accessed, primarily for fire suppression activities rather than for access to scenic features. Work began on the trail in 1934, using Civilian Conservation Corps labor from CCC Camp NP-3, with work continuing into 1935.

Besides the main trail, the trail complex includes the Sheep Creek Connecting Trail, the Swamp Canyon Connecting Trail, the Whiteman Connecting Trail and the Agua Canyon Connecting Trail. The Sheep Creek Trail was a pre-existing roadway that was used for sheep drives. The trail features fewer of the park's famous hoodoos than day-hiking trails. Several campsites are located along its length.

The Under-the-Rim Trail and its branches, except for the Sheep Creek Trail, were listed on the  National Register of Historic Places on August 25, 1995.

See also
 Riggs Spring Fire Trail

References

Park buildings and structures on the National Register of Historic Places in Utah
Protected areas of Garfield County, Utah
Protected areas of Kane County, Utah
National Register of Historic Places in Bryce Canyon National Park
Hiking trails in Utah
Civilian Conservation Corps in Utah
National Register of Historic Places in Garfield County, Utah
1934 establishments in Utah